Elena Zuasti (May 18, 1935 – April 8, 2011) was a Uruguayan stage actress and comedian.

Biography 
Zuasti was born in Montevideo in 1935. She graduated twenty years later from the Dramatic Art School and managed to enter the National Comedy, where she remained until 1976. She also taught stage performance for many decades, combining the teaching with her work as an actress. She worked, among other places, at the Faustan Italy Theater Company (in Spanish, Compañía Teatral Italia Fausta) and at Comediantes.com, which belongs to the Uruguay-United States Alliance.

She was one of the first actresses to perform on Uruguayan radio programs, introducing a practice which was unpopular in the country. She also adapted many European plays, some of which included Irish playwright Samuel Beckett's plays. 

Zuasti was also a television and film actress. Some of her featured projects include  El año del dragón, A cara o cruz and La espera (2002).

She died on April 8, 2011, probably following a heart attack while performing her character Martiniana on stage for the play Barranca abajo «Downhill». Her remains are buried at Cementerio del Buceo, Montevideo.

Filmography 
El ojo en la nuca (2001)
La espera (2002)
Uruguayos campeones (2004)

References

External links 
 
 Article on Elena Zuasti's death 

1935 births
2011 deaths
Uruguayan film actresses
Uruguayan stage actresses
People from Montevideo
Burials at Cementerio del Buceo, Montevideo